Trichodezia californiata is a moth in the family Geometridae. It is found in western North America, from Washington and Oregon to California.

References

Moths described in 1871
Cidariini